The Best American Short Stories 2017, a volume in the Best American Short Stories series, was edited by Heidi Pitlor and by guest editor Meg Wolitzer.

Short Stories included

References

Fiction anthologies
Short Stories 2017
2017 anthologies
Houghton Mifflin books